Clémence Ollivier (born 20 July 1984) is a French rugby union player. She represented  at the 2006 and 2010 Women's Rugby World Cup's.

References

1984 births
Living people
French female rugby union players